Karen A. Duncan is a biostatistician and health informatics specialist, who was named a Fellow of the Association for Computing Machinery in 2000.

Duncan earned a Ph.D. in biostatistics from the University of Oklahoma. She has worked as an associate professor at the Medical University of South Carolina, as a member of the technical staff at the Mitre Corporation, and as an independent consultant.

She is the author of the books Health Information and Health Reform: Understanding the Need for a National Health Information System (Jossey-Bass, 1994) and Community Health Information Systems: Lessons for the Future (Health Information Press, 1998).

References

Year of birth missing (living people)
Living people
Fellows of the Association for Computing Machinery
Biostatisticians
Women statisticians
Health informaticians
University of Oklahoma alumni
Medical University of South Carolina faculty
Mitre Corporation people